Piz d'Anschatscha is a mountain of the Silvretta Alps, located north of Guarda in the canton of Graubünden. It lies south of Piz Fliana, on the watershed between the valleys of Lavinuoz and Tuoi.

Piz d'Anschatscha has two summits: the northern one (2,983 m) and the southern one (2,978 m). On the south is the slightly lower Piz Champatsch (2,958 m)

References

External links
 Piz d'Anschatscha on Hikr

Mountains of Graubünden
Mountains of the Alps
Mountains of Switzerland
Scuol